Pseudanophthalmus packardi is a species of beetle found only in the Carter Caves of Kentucky. Individuals are blind and predatory, and remain close to underground streams in caves. They were first discovered in the X Cave in the late 1800s, but were mistaken for another species until Thomas C. Barr discovered its uniqueness in 1957.

References 

Trechinae
Fauna of the Southeastern United States
Beetles described in 1959